South Sarwakati is a village in Pirojpur District in the Barisal Division of southwestern Bangladesh. It is located approximately 109 kilometers (68 miles) south of Bangladesh's capital, Dhaka.

References

Populated places in Pirojpur District